Brandon J. Dirden (born 1978) is an American actor, best known for portraying Martin Luther King Jr. in the Broadway production of Robert Schenkkan's All the Way.

Career
A Morehouse College and University of Illinois graduate, Dirden made his Broadway debut in Prelude to a Kiss. He has since appeared regularly both on and off Broadway in plays such as Clybourne Park, The First Breeze of Summer and Detroit 67.

He played Dennis Aderholt in The Americans.

In 2012, he received an OBIE Award, AUDELCO VIV Award and a Theater World Award and was nominated for The Drama League and Lucille Lortell awards for his portrayal of Boy Willie in the Signature Theatre's revival of August Wilson's The Piano Lesson. In 2017 he appeared in August Wilson's Jitney at Manhattan Theatre Club, and in 2022, appeared on Broadway in both Dominique Morisseau's Skeleton Crew and the revival of Richard Greenberg's Take Me Out. Dirden was nominated for a Drama Desk Award as Outstanding Actor in a Play for his role as Reggie in Skeleton Crew.

Dirden made his directorial debut in September 2015 directing August Wilson's Seven Guitars at Two River Theater in Red Bank, New Jersey.

Dirden has guest-starred in TV series such as The Big C, The Good Wife, and Ed Burns' Public Morals.

Personal life
Dirden is married to actress Crystal A. Dickinson, whom he met while in graduate school at The University of Illinois. They have one son, Chase Ari Dirden. His brother is Jason Dirden, also an actor. They frequently appear in plays together.

References

External links

Brandon J. Dirden at the Internet Off-Broadway Database

1978 births
Living people
American male stage actors
African-American male actors
Morehouse College alumni
University of Illinois Chicago alumni
Place of birth missing (living people)
Theatre World Award winners
21st-century African-American people
20th-century African-American people